Darren Tucker (born 2 June 1962) is an Australian cricketer. He played two List A matches for New South Wales in 1989/90.

See also
 List of New South Wales representative cricketers

References

External links
 

1962 births
Living people
Australian cricketers
New South Wales cricketers
Cricketers from Sydney